Dot Jenkinson was an international lawn bowls competitor for Australia.

Bowls career

World Championships
Jenkinson won the pairs gold medal with Lorna Lucas and the fours bronze medal with Joan Vaughan, Olive Rowe and Lorna Lucas, at the 1973 World Outdoor Bowls Championship in Wellington.

Four years later she won two gold medals and a silver medal at the 1977 World Outdoor Bowls Championship in Worthing. The two gold's were in the fours with Connie Hicks, Lorna Lucas and Merle Richardson and the team event (Taylor Trophy). The silver was in the pairs with Lucas.

National
She won six Australian National Bowls Championships in the fours and secured 22 Red Cliffs Bowls Club Championship wins in the singles.

References

Date of birth missing
Possibly living people
Year of birth missing
Australian female bowls players
Bowls World Champions
20th-century Australian women